Taurian J. Fontenette (born 1983), also known as "Air Up There" and "Mr. 720", is a streetball player from Hitchcock, Texas. He is a former player on the AND1 Mixtape and Ball4Real Tours. He is 6'2" tall and weighs 185 pounds. Fontenette attended Hitchcock High School (class of 2000) and attended three different colleges: UTEP in 2000–01, Richland Junior College in 2001–04, and Paul Quinn College in 2004–05. His original streetball name was "Air Up There", but due to naming rights claimed by AND1, he goes by "Mr. 720", "Birdman", "The Human Pogo Stick", "Your Highness", and "Way Up There".

As his nickname implies, Fontenette is best known for his leaping and dunking ability. During the AND1 game in Houston, Texas, in 2006, Fontenette stunned fans by performing the first ever widely documented 720-degree dunk. Video clips of the feat have been shown on ESPN's SportsCenter and also have been widely distributed over the internet. He is also well known for his signature dunk, the axle-rider (a.k.a. the 360-degree between-the-legs), which he says he did before everyone else back in his high school days.  Fontenette is considered by some to be one of the best dunkers ever due to his sole ability to do a 720 degree dunk and the ease with which he can perform his axle-rider dunk (such as in games and on breakaways).

Professional career

Dallas Generals (2009) 
Fontenette signed a contract to play for the Dallas Generals of the American Basketball Association in 2009. However, the team folded in January 2010.

References

External links
Taurian Fontenette dunk videos

1983 births
Living people
American men's basketball players
Basketball players from Texas
Junior college men's basketball players in the United States
Paul Quinn College alumni
People from Galveston County, Texas
Sportspeople from the Houston metropolitan area
Street basketball players
University of Texas at El Paso alumni